Acleris phyllosocia is a species of moth of the family Tortricidae. It is found in northern Vietnam.

The wingspan is about 21 mm. The ground colour of the forewings is cream tinged with brownish and suffused and sprinkled with chestnut brown. There is cream scaling on some veins, mainly dorsobasally. The hindwings are grey brown.

Etymology
The name refers to the very broad, flat parts of the socii and is derived from Greek  (meaning leaf).

References

Moths described in 2008
phyllosocia
Moths of Asia
Taxa named by Józef Razowski